Coronaster briareus is a species of starfish in the family Asteriidae. It is fast moving and grows to nearly 30 cm. As a defense mechanism it can shed its legs, which later regenerate. This species has an established population in the Maltese waters.

References

Asteriidae
Animals described in 1882